is a Japanese animated series consisting of 26 episodes. It was first aired on TV Tokyo on April 5, 2004 and concluded on September 27, 2004.

Episodes

References

External links 
  Official episode list at the TV Tokyo website
  Unofficial episode list at the TV.com website

Madlax
Episodes